The year 1859 in architecture involved some significant architectural events and new buildings.

Buildings and structures

Buildings

 May 28 – All Saints, Margaret Street, London, designed by William Butterfield, is consecrated.
 September 7 – "Big Ben" in the clock tower of the Palace of Westminster in London completed by Sir Charles Barry to the designs of Augustus Pugin becomes fully operational.
 October 18 – New chapel at Exeter College, Oxford, designed by George Gilbert Scott, is dedicated.
 Red House in Bexleyheath, England designed by Philip Webb and William Morris.
 The Cooper Union for Advancement of Science and Art in New York City, founded by Peter Cooper is born with the completion of The Foundation Building, designed by Prussian-born architect and civil engineer Fred A. Petersen.
 Tennessee State Capitol in Nashville, Tennessee, United States, designed by William Strickland, is completed.
 Third Vermont State House, designed by Thomas Silloway, in Montpelier, Vermont, United States, is completed.
 Vigadó of Pest (concert hall) in Hungary, designed by Frigyes Feszl, is built.
 Main cell block of Fremantle Prison in Western Australia, designed by Brevet Major Edmund Henderson, is completed.
 Needles Lighthouse on The Needles off the Isle of Wight, designed by James Walker, is built.

Awards
 RIBA Royal Gold Medal – George Gilbert Scott.

Births
 February 13 – Zsigmond Quittner, Hungarian commercial architect (died 1918)
 March 3 – Konstantīns Pēkšēns, Latvian architect (died 1928)
 August 7 – Fyodor Schechtel, Russian architect, graphic artist and stage designer (died 1926)
 September 13 – Anton Rosen, Danish architect, furniture designer and decorative artist (died 1928)
 November 29 – Cass Gilbert, American architect (died 1934)
 December 15 – Stewart Henbest Capper, Manx-born Arts and Crafts architect (died 1925)

Deaths
 May 18 – William Donthorne, English architect, one of the founders of what becomes the Royal Institute of British Architects (RIBA) (born 1799)
 September 15 – Isambard Kingdom Brunel, English railway civil and marine engineer  and bridge builder (born 1806; stroke)
 October 12 – Robert Stephenson, English railway civil and mechanical engineer (born 1803)
 December 12 — Thomas Alexander Tefft, American architect based in Providence, Rhode Island (born 1826)

References

Architecture
Years in architecture
19th-century architecture